Frank Davis may refer to:

Politics
Frank R. Davis (1888–1948), politician in Nova Scotia, Canada
Frank Davis (Australian politician) (1900–1980), member of the Australian House of Representatives
Frank W. Davis (1936–2018), member of the Oklahoma House of Representatives
Frank Davis (Liberal politician), British politician, mayor of Finchley

Sports
Bunch Davis (Frank Davis, fl. 1906–1911), American baseball player 
Frank Davis (cricketer) (1904–1973), Australian cricketer
Frank Davis (Irish footballer) (1921–2006)
Frank Davis (Australian rules footballer) (born 1944)
Frank Davis (American football) (born 1981), gridiron football guard

Others
F. A. Davis (1850–1917), American publisher and entrepreneur
Frank Marshall Davis (1905–1987), African-American journalist and writer
Frank H. Davis (1910–1979), Vermont businessman and public official
Frank Davis (serial killer) (1953–2008), American serial killer
Frank Davis (Scout) (1923–1940), English Boy Scout awarded a posthumous Bronze Cross
Frank Davis (screenwriter), screenwriter of A Tree Grows in Brooklyn
Frank Joseph Davis (1942–2013), radio and television personality in New Orleans, Louisiana

See also
Francis Davis (disambiguation)
Franklin Davis (disambiguation)
Frank Davies (disambiguation)